Huntsville is a city in and the county seat of Walker County, Texas. The population was 45,941 as of the 2020 census. It is the center of the Huntsville micropolitan area. Huntsville is in the East Texas Piney Woods on Interstate 45 and home to  Texas State Prison, Sam Houston State University, the Texas Department of Criminal Justice, Huntsville State Park, and HEARTS Veterans Museum of Texas. 

The city served as the residence of Sam Houston, who is recognized in Huntsville by the Sam Houston Memorial Museum and a statue on Interstate 45.

History

The city had its beginning around 1836, when Pleasant and Ephraim Gray opened a trading post on the site. Ephraim Gray became first postmaster in 1837, naming it after his hometown, Huntsville, Alabama.

Huntsville became the home of Sam Houston, who served as President of the Republic of Texas, Governor of the State of Texas, Governor of Tennessee, U.S. Senator, and Tennessee congressman. Houston led the Texas Army in the Battle of San Jacinto, the decisive victory of the Texas Revolution. He has been noted for his life among the Cherokees of Tennessee, and— near the end of his life — for his opposition to the American Civil War, a very unpopular position in his day. Huntsville has two of Houston's homes, his grave, and the Sam Houston Memorial Museum. Houston's life in Huntsville is also commemorated by his namesake Sam Houston State University, and by a  statue. (The towering statue, "A Tribute to Courage" by artist David Adickes, has been described as the world's largest statue of an American hero, and is easily viewed by travelers on Interstate 45.)

Huntsville was also the home of Samuel Walker Houston (1864–1945), a prominent African-American pioneer in the field of education. He was born into slavery on February 12, 1864 to Joshua Houston, a slave owned by Sam Houston. Samuel W. Houston founded the Galilee Community School in 1907, which later became known as the Houstonian Normal and Industrial Institute, in Walker County, Texas.

In 1995, on the grounds of the old Samuel W. Houston Elementary School, the Huntsville Independent School District, along with the Huntsville Arts Commission and the high school's Ex-Students Association, commissioned the creation of The Dreamers, a monument to underscore the black community's contributions to the growth and development of Huntsville and Walker County.

After a book display at the Huntsville Public Library (HPL) riled up city officials in 2022, the library removed two book displays. Following the removal of the two book displays, the city decided to privatize the library.

Demographics

As of the 2020 United States census, there were 45,941 people, 13,187 households, and 5,893 families residing in the city.

As of the census of 2010, there were 35,078 people, 10,266 households, and 7,471 families residing in the city. The population density was 1438.3/km sq (10,135.1/mi sq). There were 11,508 housing units at an average density of 1143.8/km sq (1372.4/mi sq). The racial makeup of the city was 65.78% White, 26.14% African American, 0.33% Native American, 1.11% Asian, 0.07% Pacific Islander, 4.91% from Race (United States Census) other races, and 1.65% from two or more races. Hispanic or Latino of any race were 16.22% of the population.

There were 10,266 households, out of which 25.3% had children under the age of 18 living with them, 37.0% were married couples living together, 12.5% had a female householder with no husband present, and 46.7% were non-families. 30.8% of all households were made up of individuals, and 7.5% had someone living alone who was 65 years of age or older. The average household size was 2.31 and the average family size was 2.97.

In the city, the population was spread out, with 15.1% under the age of 18, 29.3% from 18 to 24, 30.8% from 25 to 44, 16.3% from 45 to 64, and 8.5% who were 65 years of age or older. The median age was 28 years. For every 100 females, there were 152.9 males. For every 100 females age 18 and over, there were 163.8 males. The prison population is included in the city's population, which results in a significantly skewed sex ratio.

The median income for a household in the city was $27,075, and the median income for a family was $40,562. Males had a median income of $27,386 versus $22,908 for females. The per capita income for the city was $13,576. About 13.1% of families and 23.9% of the population were below the poverty line, including 23.9% of those under age 18 and 14.7% of those age 65 or over.

Geography
Huntsville is located at  (30.711254, −95.548373).

According to the United States Census Bureau, the city has a land area of 35.86 square miles in 2010.

At the area code level, land area covers 559.661 sq. mi. and water area 7.786 sq. mi.

It is part of the Texas Triangle megaregion.

Climate
The climate in this area is characterized by hot, humid summers and generally mild to cool winters.  According to the Köppen Climate Classification system, Huntsville has a humid subtropical climate, abbreviated "Cfa" on climate maps.

Economy

As of 2022, the largest employer in Huntsville is the Texas Department of Criminal Justice, with 6,744 employees. In 1996 the TDCJ had 5,219 employees in Huntsville. Robert Draper of the Texas Monthly described Huntsville as the "company town" of the TDCJ; he stated that the industry was "recession-proof" and that "It's hard to find a person in Huntsville who doesn't have at least an indirect affiliation with the prison system" since many businesses indirectly rely on its presence. As of 1996 the TDCJ employed over twice the number of people employed by Sam Houston State University, the city's second-largest employer.

As of 2022, Sam Houston State remained the second-largest employer in Huntsville, with 2,417 employees. The university has a strong role in the study of criminology. The third-largest employer is the Huntsville Independent School District, with 980 employees. The fourth-largest employer, Huntsville Memorial Hospital, has 552 employees. 485 employees work for the fifth-largest employer, Wal-Mart.

As of 2020, Huntsville's average income was lower than Texas's average income.

Government and infrastructure

State representation

Texas Department of Criminal Justice

Huntsville has the headquarters of the Texas Department of Criminal Justice (TDCJ), the Texas agency that operates state correctional facilities for adults. The Texas prison system has been headquartered in Huntsville since Texas's founding as a republic, and the TDCJ is the only major state agency not headquartered in Austin, the state capital.

Several TDCJ prisons for men, including the Byrd Unit, the Goree Unit, the Huntsville Unit (home of the state's execution chamber), and the Wynne Unit, are within Huntsville's city limits. The Holliday Unit, a transfer unit, is also in Huntsville.

The TDCJ Central Region Warehouse and Huntsville Prison Store are in the TDCJ headquarters complex. The Food Service Warehouse is behind the Wynne Unit. The TDCJ operates the Huntsville District Parole Office in Huntsville.

As of 1996 the TDCJ director resided in a mansion across the street from the Huntsville Unit.

Other state agencies
The headquarters of the Texas Forensic Science Commission is located at Sam Houston State University.

Transportation
Greyhound Lines operates the Huntsville Station in Huntsville. As of 2001 many former prisoners released from the Texas Department of Criminal Justice system use the station to travel to their final destinations. The station is three blocks uphill from the Huntsville Unit, a point of release for prisoners exiting the TDCJ.

Bruce Brothers Huntsville Regional Airport is located in Huntsville. Renamed from the Huntsville Municipal Airport in 2009, Bruce Brothers Huntsville Regional Airport is a city-owned, public-use airport. As of December 2015, it is still listed as the Huntsville Municipal Airport by the Federal Aviation Administration and the Texas Department of Transportation.

Major highways

Culture

In September 2009, the Huntsville Cultural District was designated by the Texas Commission on the Arts as one of the first seven state cultural districts. Museums, art galleries, artist studios and workshops, historic homes, theaters and theatrical performances are located within the Cultural District in historic Downtown Huntsville. The Cultural District is also home to some of the finest historical architecture in Texas, including murals created by world-renowned artist Richard Haas and unique homes built from recycled materials created by Dan Phillips of Phoenix Commotion complement the historic aspects of the district. You can enjoy self-guided walking and driving tours, art activities, music-theater-dance performances, shopping, antiquing, and unique eateries.

Ruth Massingill and Ardyth Broadrick Sohn, authors of Prison City: Life with the Death Penalty in Huntsville, Texas, said that Huntsville shares several traits with other small towns. For instance many insiders include members of Huntsville's founding families, who still reside in Huntsville. They also said "Disagreement is a well-established Huntsville tradition." The authors say that debate is a significant part of the leadership agenda, and that the residents of Huntsville disagree about capital punishment.

Media

Newspapers
The Huntsville Item is the community's newspaper.

The Houstonian is the SHSU student newspaper.

Radio
KRBE 104.1 FM Houston's #1 Hits

KHMX ("Mix 96.5") 96.5 FM Houston

KHVL 104.9 FM/1490 AM  Music From the '60s, '70s and '80s

KSAM 101.7 FM  New Country Music

KSHU 90.5 FM  College-Sam Houston State

Education

Primary and secondary schools
The majority of the City of Huntsville is served by the Huntsville Independent School District (HISD).

By 2007, a Huntsville community report stated that over 50% of the HISD students are "classified as economically disadvantaged"; this is a higher percentage than the overall state percentage. As of 2007 over 18% of the students do not graduate from high school.

List of Schools (by education level):

Preschool/Pre-K
 Gibbs Pre-K Center

Elementary
 Estella Stewart Elementary School
 Huntsville Elementary School
 Samuel W. Houston Elementary School
 Scott E Johnson Elementary School

Intermediate
 Huntsville Intermediate School

Middle
 Mance Park Middle School

High
 Huntsville High School

Private
 Alpha Omega Academy (Pre-K–12)
 Tomorrow's Promise, The Montessori School of Huntsville (Pre-K–12)
 Summit Christian Academy (Pre-K–12)

A very small portion of the city of Huntsville is within the New Waverly Independent School District.

Colleges and universities

Sam Houston State University is located in Huntsville. It also served as the first location for Austin College.

Residents of both Huntsville ISD and New Waverly ISD (and therefore the whole city of Huntsville) are served by the Lone Star College System (formerly North Harris-Montgomery Community College).

Public libraries

The  Huntsville Public Library opened on Sunday September 24, 1967 after the group "Friends for a Huntsville Public Library" had campaigned for the opening of a public library. The Huntsville Public Library provides a relevant print collection as well as offering access to electronic resources, as well as having over forty public access computers for adults, teens, and children. The Texas State library has made available a large array of professional databases, giving the public access to thousands of professional journals, encyclopedias, language programs, educational tutorials, and informational sites. Patrons of the Huntsville Public Library have access to information that was previously only available at university and major public libraries. 

In 2022 the library took away a display related to LGBTQ topics. In December of that month the city council voted to have Library Systems & Services, a private company, operate the library.

Adult prisoner education

The Windham School District, which provides educational services to prisoners in the TDCJ, is headquartered in Building B in the Wynne Unit in Huntsville.

Tourism
Huntsville has several tourist attractions, including an art tour, a downtown walking tour, a Prison Driving Tour, Sam Houston's grave, the Sam Houston Memorial Museum, the Sam Houston Woodland Home, A Tribute to Courage (a 67 foot tall statue of Sam Houston), The Texas Prison Museum, and a folk and cowboy music festival held every April.

A Tribute to Courage is the world's tallest statue of an American Hero. Standing on a 10-foot granite base, the 67-foot tall statue of Sam Houston is visible from I-45 northbound for 6.5 miles. David Adickes, the creator of Big Sam, transformed 60 tons of concrete and steel into the monument and dedicated the statue to the City of Huntsville on October 22, 1994. 

Within the Huntsville Cultural District, the Wynne Home Arts & Visitor Center offers a wide variety of arts and cultural programs tailored to the interests and needs of Huntsville's diverse community.

The Sam Houston National Forest is one of just four National Forests in Texas. The forest contains 163,037 acres between Huntsville, Conroe, Cleveland, and Richards. The forest is home to the 128-mile Lone Star Hiking Trail, a portion of which has gained National Recreation Trail status.

Photo Gallery

Notable people

 Dana Andrews, actor
 Jacy Reese Anthis, writer
 Judge James A. Baker, attorney and banker 
 Captain James A. Baker, attorney of William Marsh Rice
 Lois Blount, historian and teacher
 Chuck Clements, American football player
 Erin Cummings, actress
 James Davidson, American football player
 David Catchings Dickson, politician
 Royal Dixon, author
 James A. Elkins, attorney
 Craig Flournoy, journalist and professor
 Justin Gilbert, American football player
 Sam Houston, politician
 Samuel Walker Houston, pioneer
 Cody Johnson, Musician
 Charles G. Keenan, politician and physician
 Richard Linklater, movie director
 Marcus Luttrell, former Navy-SEAL
 Austin McGary, sheriff
 Matt Powledge, American football coach
 Dan Rather, journalist
 Derrick Ross, American football player
 Thaksin Shinawatra, Thai politician
 John Thomason, author
 Rex Tillerson, former ExxonMobil CEO and 69th United States Secretary of State
 Dave Ward, journalist
 Mark Hanna Watkins, African-American linguist and anthropologist
 Charlie Wilson, U.S. politician
 Steve Forrest
 John N. Raney

See also

 Texas Prison Rodeo
 Captain Joe Byrd Cemetery

Footnotes

References
 
 Massingill, Ruth and Ardyth Broadrick Sohn. Prison City: Life with the Death Penalty in Huntsville, Texas. Peter Lang, 2007. , .
 "One man's trash ... by Kate Murphy, The New York Times, September 2, 2009. Retrieved 2009-09-08. Regarding Dan Phillips building low-income housing largely out of recycled materials since 1997.

External links

 City of Huntsville
 Discover Huntsville
 Texas Prison Museum
 Sam Houston Memorial Museum
 Historical photographs of Huntsville can be found at the University of Houston Digital Library

Cultural attractions
 Artist Richard Haas
 The Wynne Arts Center
 SHSU College of Fine Arts and Mass Communication
 Phoenix Commotion
 Old Town Theatre
 Sam Houston Memorial Museum

 
Cities in Walker County, Texas
Cities in Texas
County seats in Texas
Micropolitan areas of Texas
Populated places established in the 1830s
1830s establishments in Texas